"Riva (Restart the Game)" is a song by French deep house producer Klingande featuring vocals from Broken Back. The song was released in France as a digital download on 2 March 2015. It charted in Austria, Belgium, France, Germany, Italy, Norway and Switzerland. Written and produced by Klingande, the song also features harmonica played by Greg Zlap and is not a saxophone that has been modified as some people have believed.

Music video
A music video to accompany the release of "Riva (Restart the Game)" was first released onto YouTube on 19 March 2015, at a total length of four minutes and twenty-five seconds.

Charts

Weekly charts

Year-end charts

Certifications

Release history

References

2014 songs
2015 singles
Klingande songs
Tropical house songs
Songs written by Klingande